Johan Lorbeer is a German artist concerned with phenomena of perception. He best known for levitating in the air, with an arm touching the surface of a building.

Vita 
Johan Lorbeer (* 11 June 1950 in Bückeburg ) is a German artist, based in Berlin since 1985. His artistic work oscillates between monochrome painting and super-slow

performance. In 1996, he received the Karl-Hofer Prize of the “Hochschule der Künste” (HdK), Berlin for his performance "Rothko-Fax". In 2011, his publication "Geschäftsbericht" was awarded as best art book at the International Book Fair held in Frankfurt. He taught as a professor at the University of the Arts (UdK) in Berlin from 2000 - 2015.

Work 

Lorbeer’s work is composed of 2 prominent genres - Monochrome field painting and Super-Slow performance. Poised between image and performance, Johan Lorbeer is different from other contemporary artists of his kind. Due to the artist's colour blindness, the phenomena of colour plays a major role in his work, which is equally concerned with both sculptural and performance aspects. There are many historical style links with Modern art, with Constructive-Concrete as well as with Concept Art and Monochrome painting . The two principal elements of his work, sometimes mutually and self-reflexive, are also lined with elements of humour, anarchy and subversive critique.

In the last years, Johan Lorbeer became internationally known for pioneering super slow anti-gravity performances. His performances have served as  inspiration for other artists who have interpreted and integrated his concepts into their own works.

Super-Slow/Still-Life Performances 
In Lorbeer’s Super-Slow/Still-Life Performances, the artist questions the phenomenon of our everyday spatial perceptions. Characteristic of his performances is the physically inexplicable spatial presence of the artist, which causes the viewer to reflect on his own  point of view.

Lorbeer himself speaks of Still - Life performances. The situations he creates in them straddle the borderline between image and performance and are fascinating because of their apparent incompatibility with our spatial visual experiences. In 1987, he created his first work in a series of still life performances  with the title : “Dedicated to my Mother", with 26 porcelain plates, and further works “Working class Hero” 1995 and “Tarzan/Standing Leg" (2002). With this term - Still Life Performance - he describes an artistic act, the working language of different types of visual art such as sculpture, installation, and dramatic body gesture. At the center of this creative effort are spatial-temporal gaps, interruptions, transitions, and inversions. Through the fixation of his own body in a highly unusual place and condition in time and space, the artist is striving to express its fluidity in a physical way. His performances have a duration of 2–3 hours.

Just as the human body is expressed through the sculptures of Giacometti as fading into the distance, so Lorbeer’s live sculptures attempt to widen perception, but in terms of duration rather than distance.  The physically extended reality of the moment contains a super-slow view.  The fluidity of the moment becomes visible and perceptible.  It allows one to perceive inconspicuous phenomena which are created by the reality of the senses.

Monochrome Painting 
The identification of colours, caused by the partial colour blindness of the artist, is the basic motif for his examination of the phenomenon of colour. He uses the colour in its various expressions such as: industrial colour films, fresco pigments, children's crayons, Chinese ink, as well as colour tones that Lorbeer extracts from vegetable juices. His monochrome works were only exhibited a few times, for instance at the Laden für Nichts, Berlin 1989, and the Pallazzo del Espositione, Rome 1992.

In 1985, Lorbeer created a series of temporary colour works illegally in different Berlin subway stations. There, the artist covered large underground areas in multicoloured adhesive foils on top of the under paths beneath the tracks and along the walls.

His interaction between colour-works and performance is best seen in his performance Rothko Fax which was presented in 1991 at the Künstlerhaus Bethanien.  In this performance, Lorbeer stands in 2 buckets of liquid emulsion paint, holding 2 dry coloured bath terry towels, resembling and honouring Mark Rothko’s Colour Field Painting, in an extremely unstable body position.

Since 2002, the artist has developed a series of monochrome wing paintings, which are worked on both the front and back side to utilize the material to its fullest potential. These wing paintings are attached to the walls with hinges and can be swung and opened in different directions. This creates permanently changing colour spatial compositions that can be independently choreographed by the viewers.

Selected Performances/Exhibitions 
1987 Cafe Swing,  Berlin West

1988  KH Bethanien, Berlin West

1988  Galerie Deloch, Berlin DDR

1989  Insel der Jugend, Berlin DDR

1990  Galerie Defet, Nürnberg

1992 Galerie Zwinger, Berlin

1996 Galerie Weiss Berlin, HDK Berlin, Art Chicago, KH Bethanien Berlin,

1997  Stadtmuseum Mainz, Albertinum Dresden, La Salpetriere Paris, Festspiele Zurich

1998  HFBK Hamburg, NBK Berlin, Podewil Berlin, Kunsthal Copenhagen

1999  HH Bahnhof Berlin, Alte Pinakothek Munich, Stadtgalerie Saarbruecken, Kunsthalle Hamburg

2000  Maximiliansforum Munich, Goethe-Institut S. de Bahia, Museum of Concrete Art Ingolstadt

2001  art on Gallery Berlin, Kunsthal Copenhagen, L´ Usine Geneve, Kunstmuseum Luzern

2002  neues museum Nuremberg, artforum Berlin, Zicco House Beirut, KH Bethanien Berlin

2003  Museum of Modern Art Frankfurt, The Arches Glasgow, HAU 1 Berlin

2004  Academy of Art Bergen,  Museum Center Krasnojarsk, State Art Museum Novosibirsk

2005  Gasteig Munich, Mies van der Rohe Pavillion Barcelona, corpi urbani Genova

2006  Goethe- Institut Cairo, Academy of Arts Berlin, Galerie Wort+Bild Berlin, Oper Leipzig

2007  Centro Arte Contemporaneo Malaga, Vooruit Gent, Center of Contemporary Art Linz

2008  Fondazione Volume Rome, Centro Cultural Reina Sofia, Cadiz, Stadsschouburg Utrecht

2009  Centro Cultural de Belem Lisbon, Escena Contemporanea Madrid, Goethe-Institut La Paz

2010  Kunsthaus Aarau, mothership Rotterdam, Goethe-Institut Tunis, Museo Artium, Gasteiz

2011  Alhondiga Art Center Bilbao, Centre Pompidou Metz, Crawford Art Gallery York,

2012  Scene National Theatre Bretigny, Goethe-Institut Caracas, Sin Fronteras Zaragoza

2013  Beurschouwburg Bruxelles, Theatre de Warande Turnhout,  Scene Conventionne Saint Medard

2014  ARCUB Bucharest, Goethe-Institut Algiers, TAC Valladolid, International Magic Festival Edinburgh

2015  ZKM Globale Karlsruhe, vienna biennale Vienna, Galerie Burster Berlin, Goethe Institut Helsinki

2017  Intern. Festival of Art San Jose, Dreifaltigkeitskirche Worms, Quartier 104 Paris, ZAT Montpellier,

2018  China Academy of Art Hangzhou, Theaterfestival Willebroek

2020  Painting Wow Kunstsäle Berlin, Druckhaus Saalpresse Bergsdorf, Knock Hard Studio Berlin

2021  theater fabrik Potsdam, Knock Hard Studio Berlin, Art Today - City Gallery Plovdiv,

Selected Publications 
Johan Lorbeer, Performances, Publ. KH Bethanien Berlin 1998, 

Johan Lorbeer, Verlag fuer moderne Kunst, Nuremberg 1999, 

Johan Lorbeer, Monographie, Kunstforum International 2005, Bd. 178

Johan Lorbeer, Geschaeftsbericht, Verlag fuer moderne Kunst, Nuremberg 2010,

Selected Contributions/Anthologies 
PAN, Benteli Verlag, Bern 1992, 

XX. Jahrhundert, Nicolai Verlag, Berlin 1999, 

Kunst und Arbeit, Klartext Verlag, Essen 2000 

Defet - neues museum, VfmK, Nuernberg 2002, 

Kunstjahr 2002, Lindinger+Schmid, Regensburg 2002, 

Tatlin news+mono, Publ. Sergey Kovalevsky, Moscow 2007

Gravity, MM artbook, Cork 2011, 

VIENNA BIENNALE, VfmK, Vienna 2015, 

Performing Public Art, Verlag de Gruyter, Berlin 2015,

References

External links
 Not magic
 Official site (In German)
 Optical illusions site
 donau festival site
 Pictures
 Photograph revealing methods

Buskers
Living people
1950 births